The men's single sculls competition at the 2008 Summer Olympics in Beijing was held between 9 and 16 August, at the Shunyi Olympic Rowing-Canoeing Park. There were 32 competitors from 32 nations. The event was won by Olaf Tufte of Norway, the fifth man to successfully defend an Olympic title in the event (and 12th to win multiple medals of any colour). The silver medal went to Ondřej Synek of the Czech Republic, the nation's first medal in the event (though Czech rower Václav Chalupa had earned silver in 1992 for Czechoslovakia). Mahé Drysdale of New Zealand earned bronze. Both Synek and Drysdale would go on to win medals in the event again in 2012 and 2016 (with Drysdale the gold medallist both times).

Background

This was the 25th appearance of the event. Rowing had been on the programme in 1896 but was cancelled due to bad weather. The single sculls has been held every time that rowing has been contested, beginning in 1900.

Eight of the 18 A/B/C semifinalists from the 2004 Games returned: gold medallist Olaf Tufte of Norway, fourth-place finisher Santiago Fernández of Argentina, sixth-place finisher Tim Maeyens of Belgium, seventh-place finisher (and 2000 bronze medallist) Marcel Hacker of Germany, eighth-place finisher André Vonarburg of Switzerland, thirteenth-place finisher (who had taken the same place in 2000) Anderson Nocetti of Brazil, fourteenth-place finisher (and 1996 and 2000 competitor) Ali Ibrahim of Egypt, and eighteenth-place finisher Law Hiu Fung of Hong Kong. Tufte, despite being defending champion, was not the favorite; that was Mahé Drysdale of New Zealand, who had won all three World Championships since the 2008 Games (Tufte had a silver and a bronze in that time). Other contenders included Hacker, trying to come back from a disappointing Final B performance in 2004; Ondřej Synek of the Czech Republic, with a silver and two bronze medals in the last three Worlds; Fernández, the reigning Pan American champion, and Alan Campbell of Great Britain, the Diamond Challenge Sculls winner in 2007. 

Cameroon, Colombia, Honduras, Iran, Lithuania, Monaco, and Venezuela each made their debut in the event. Great Britain and the United States each made their 20th appearance, tied for most among nations.

Qualification

Nations had been limited to one boat (one rower) each since 1912. The 33 qualifiers were:

 11 boats from the 2007 World Championships
 6 boats from the Asian Qualification Regatta
 4 boats from the 2007 All-Africa Games
 6 boats from the Latin American Qualification Regatta
 4 boats from the Final Qualification Regatta
 2 invitational boats

Competition format

This rowing event is a single scull event, meaning that each boat is propelled by a single rower. The "scull" portion means that the rower uses two oars, one on each side of the boat; this contrasts with sweep rowing in which each rower has one oar and rows on only one side (not feasible for singles events). The competition consists of multiple rounds. The format continued to use four rounds, as in previous Games, but instead of three main rounds and a repechage, all four rounds were main rounds: there was no repechage. Finals were held to determine the placing of each boat; these finals were given letters with those nearer to the beginning of the alphabet meaning a better ranking. Semifinals were named based on which finals they fed, with each semifinal having two possible finals. The course used the 2000 metres distance that became the Olympic standard in 1912. 

During the first round six heats were held. The top four boats in each heat advanced to the quarterfinals, while all others were relegated to the E/F semifinals.

The quarterfinals were the second round for rowers still competing for medals. Placing in the quarterfinal heats determined which semifinal the boat would race in. The top three boats in each quarterfinal moved on to the A/B semifinals, with the bottom three boats going to the C/D semifinals.

Six semifinals were held, two each of A/B semifinals, C/D semifinals, and E/F semifinals. For each semifinal race, the top three boats moved on to the better of the two finals, while the bottom three boats went to the lesser of the two finals possible. For example, a second-place finish in an A/B semifinal would result in advancement to the A final.

The fourth and final round was the finals. Each final determined a set of rankings. The A final determined the medals, along with the rest of the places through 6th. The B final gave rankings from 7th to 12th, the C from 13th to 18th, and so on. Thus, to win a medal rowers had to finish in the top four of their heat, top three of their quarterfinal, and top three of their A/B semifinal to reach the A final.

Schedule

All times are China Standard Time (UTC+8)

Results

Heats

The top four in each heat advanced to the quarterfinals, remaining in medal contention. Fifth and sixth placed boats went to the E/F semifinals, eligible for ranking between 25 and 32.

Heat 1

Heat 2

Heat 3

Heat 4

Heat 5

Heat 6

Quarterfinals

The top three boats in each quarterfinal went to the A/B semifinals, still in contention for medals and guaranteed to be in the top 12. Fourth through sixth place boats went to the C/D semifinals, ultimately ranked 13th through 24th.

Quarterfinal 1

Quarterfinal 2

Quarterfinal 3

Quarterfinal 4

Semifinals

The top three boats in each semifinal went to the better final, while the fourth through sixth placed boats went to the lower final.

Semifinal E/F 1

Semifinal E/F 2

Semifinal C/D 1

Semifinals C/D 2

Semifinal A/B 1

Semifinal A/B 2

Finals

Final F

Final E

Final D

Final C

Final B

Final A

Results summary

References

External links
NYT Olympic Report

Rowing at the 2008 Summer Olympics
Men's events at the 2008 Summer Olympics